Kenneth William David Hensley (24 August 1945 – 4 November 2020) was an English musician, singer, songwriter and producer, best known for his work with Uriah Heep during the 1970s.

He wrote or co-wrote the majority of Uriah Heep's songs during this period, including the singles "Lady in Black" (on which he sang lead vocals), "Easy Livin'" and "Stealin'", as well as "Look at Yourself", and "Free Me".

Biography
Born in Plumstead, south-east London, Hensley moved with his parents, three brothers and sister to Stevenage, Hertfordshire, in 1945. He learned how to play guitar at the age of 12 from a Bert Weedon manual. His first gig was at The Mentmore Pen Factory, in Stevenage (September 1960). After that, he played with The Blue Notes, Ken and the Cousins and Kit and the Saracens (1962). In 1963, this band evolved into The Jimmy Brown Sound, and they recorded some now lost songs. At this time, Hensley's first "professional" opportunity almost came about: they were to back Ben E. King on a British visit, but it never happened.

In early 1965, Hensley formed a band called The Gods, with the young guitarist Mick Taylor, well known later for his work with John Mayall and The Rolling Stones. Hensley wrote most of the material, sang and played the Hammond B3 organ as the band already had Taylor on guitar. The Gods' line-up included, at one time or another, vocalist and guitar/bass player Greg Lake (later of King Crimson and Emerson, Lake & Palmer), bass player Paul Newton (later the first Uriah Heep bassist), drummer Lee Kerslake (later also of Heep), bassist John Glascock (later of Jethro Tull), and guitarist Joe Konas. In early 1968, they signed with Columbia Records and recorded two LPs and several singles.

Hensley also then played on a one-album side project of The Gods initially planned to become their third album, but was recorded and eventually released in 1969/1970 under the moniker Head Machine's Orgasm. The album was produced by David Paramor (producer of "The Gods") and both Hensley and Kerslake featured, along with John Glascock on bass, Brian Glascock on drums, and David Paramor on vocals, all under pseudonyms. Hensley played mostly guitar again, as in the beginning of his career. Although Paramor was credited as composer, the songs bear many of Hensley's influences. The album was released before Hensley joined Toe Fat, and might almost be considered a prototype for the harder side of his future work in Uriah Heep.

The band eventually split but Cliff Bennett, from the Rebel Rousers, decided to move in a more "progressive" direction and asked The Gods to join him. Under the name Toe Fat they released two LPs, but only the first featured Hensley.

Paul Newton asked Hensley (Christmas 1969) to join forces in Spice, as they were looking for a keyboard player to make their sound less bluesy and more progressive, in keeping with the current trend. In January 1970, Spice changed its name into Uriah Heep. Also in the line-up were guitarist Mick Box and vocalist David Byron. With Uriah Heep, Hensley found a place to develop and showcase his songwriting and lyrical abilities as well as his keyboard and guitar playing. 

The band's "classic" line-up featured Hensley, Byron, Box, Kerslake and bassist Gary Thain, plus the management provided by Gerry Bron (Bronze Records). During his time with Heep (1970–1980), they recorded 13 studio albums, and the live album Uriah Heep Live – January 1973 along with many compilations and singles. Hensley also recorded his first two solo albums, Proud Words on a Dusty Shelf (1973) and Eager To Please (1975) during this time.  He was supported mainly by Mark Clarke and Bugs Pemberton.

After the departure of bassist Gary Thain (who died in 1975) and vocalist David Byron, other musicians were brought into the Heep family: John Wetton (Family, King Crimson, Roxy Music, later of U.K. and Asia), Trevor Bolder (from Spiders From Mars, later of Wishbone Ash) and John Lawton (Lucifer's Friend), among others.

In 1980 Hensley left the band, unhappy with the musical direction they had chosen. After trying to put a new band together in the UK (Shotgun), he later moved to the US and played a few gigs in North America as The Ken Hensley Band. Around this time he released his third solo LP, Free Spirit (1980).

In 1982, Hensley joined Blackfoot, a hard rock Florida-based band. With them, he recorded two albums (1983's Siogo and 1984's Vertical Smiles). Although the group achieved some success, Hensley left after Bron informed him of Heep vocalist David Byron's death in 1985.

After 1985, Hensley lived in semi-retirement in St Louis, Missouri (US), making a few appearances with W.A.S.P., Cinderella and others. W.A.S.P.'s frontman Blackie Lawless stated that "Ken Hensley wrote the rule book for heavy metal keyboards as far as I'm concerned." Hensley also owned "The Attic" Recording studio in St. Louis.

In 1994, From Time To Time, a collection of lost recordings, was released featuring rare songs recorded by Hensley between 1971 and 1982, as well as some early versions of Heep's classic songs, played by Hensley and his roommates at that time, namely guitarist Paul Kossoff and drummer Simon Kirke (both of Free). Other musicians on the songs were bassist Boz Burrell (King Crimson and Bad Company), guitarist Mick Ralphs (Mott the Hoople, Bad Company), drummers Ian Paice (Deep Purple, Whitesnake) and Kenney Jones (The Small Faces, The Faces, The Who), amongst others.

In 1999, Hensley's musical activities began to increase, besides his work with St Louis Music. He recorded an album, A Glimpse of Glory, together with his band Visible Faith.

During the fourth Uriah Heep Annual Convention in London, May 2000, plans were made for a one-off concert by the so-called "Hensley/Lawton Band". Hensley was joined by former Uriah Heep singer John Lawton, their first public collaboration since the latter's departure from Uriah Heep in 1979. With them were Paul Newton (the band's original bassist) and two members of Lawton's band, Reuben Kane on lead guitar and Justin Shefford on drums. They played a set of old Uriah Heep classics and some of Hensley's solo songs, and the concert was recorded for a CD release, followed by an extensive tour of Europe during Spring and Summer of 2001 culminating with a concert on 12 May in Hamburg, Germany,  featuring a full orchestra and a new rendition of Heep's old classic song "Salisbury". After the tour, both Ken and John returned to their respective solo careers. 

On 7 December 2001, both John Lawton and Ken Hensley appeared on stage with Uriah Heep during the annual Magician's Birthday Party at the Shepherd's Bush Empire in London. This concert was recorded and released as a CD/DVD.

Running Blind, his first effort in 21 years, was released worldwide in 2002 and followed by a world tour with his band called "Free Spirit", that included Dave Kilminster (guitar), Andy Pyle (bass) and Pete Riley (drums).

After moving to Spain, Hensley released The Last Dance (with new songs), The Wizard's Diary (Uriah Heep classics re-recorded in 2004) and Cold Autumn Sunday (Hensley's solo songs re-recorded in 2005).

Featuring a number of special guests, the rock opera Blood on the Highway was released in May 2007. The story portrays the rise and fall of a rock'n'roll star. Lead vocals role were split between Hensley and Glenn Hughes (ex-Deep Purple, Trapeze, Black Sabbath), Jørn Lande (ex-The Snakes, Masterplan), John Lawton and Eve Gallagher.

In September 2008, Hensley went on stage again with former Heep bandmates Lawton, Kerslake and Newton along with ex-Focus guitarist Jan Dumée, for the "Heepvention 2008" fans meeting.

Hensley continued to write and record a series of new albums, beginning with a collection of songs under the title of Love & Other Mysteries, recorded near his home in Spain and followed in 2011 by Faster, his first studio recording of new songs with his live band, Live Fire. A CD of one of his solo concerts was released by Cherry Red Records in 2013, shortly followed by a live CD recorded with Live Fire during a September/October tour. Trouble, an album of 10 new songs recorded with a revised Live Fire line-up was released, again by Cherry Red, in September the same year.

In later years, Hensley and his wife Monica lived in the village of Agost near Alicante in Spain.

Hensley died on 4 November 2020, at the age of 75 following a short illness. He had finished an album titled My Book of Answers before his death, that was released on 5 March 2021.

Bands and guest appearances

 The Gods (1965–1969) – lead vocals, keyboards, occasional guitar
 Head Machine (1969) – lead vocals, keyboards, guitars (This was a one-album project put together by a producer)
 Toe Fat (1969) – guitars, backing vocals, keyboards 
 Uriah Heep (1970–1980) – keyboards, backing and occasional lead vocals, acoustic and slide guitar, primary songwriter
 Weed (1971) – lead vocals, keyboards, guitars (A one-album side project for Hensley. The other musicians playing on the album are thought to have been from a German band called Virus)
 Shotgun (1981) – lead vocals, keyboards, guitars
 Ken Hensley Band (1981) – lead vocals, keyboards, guitars
 Blackfoot (1982–1985) – keyboards, backing vocals, slide guitar
 W.A.S.P. (The Headless Children, 1989) – keyboards
 Cinderella (Heartbreak Station, 1990) – Hammond organ
 Ken Hensley & Visible Faith (1999) – lead vocals, keyboards, guitars
 Bruce Cameron (Midnight Daydream, 1999) – keyboards
 Hensley/Lawton Band (2000–2001) – keyboards, guitars, lead and backing vocals
 Ken Hensley/John Wetton (2001) – keyboards, guitars, lead and backing vocals
 Ken Hensley & Free Spirit (2002) – keyboards, guitars, lead vocals
 Ayreon (2004) – Hammond solo on Loser from the album The Human Equation
 Ken Hensley & The Viking All-Stars Band (2005) – keyboards, guitars, lead vocals
 Ken Hensley & Live Fire (2006–2020) – keyboards, guitars, lead vocals
 Maks and the Minors (2007) producer and guest Hammond keyboards on three tracks 
 Therion (2007) – Hammond solo on Trul from the album Gothic Kabbalah
 B.T.R. (2008) – keyboards, guitars, lead and backing vocals (The Bulgarian hard rock band played with Hensley on a few occasions most of which also included John Lawton)
 Toni Rowland (Unfolding, 2010) – keyboards, guitars, producer
 Sunrize (2011) – Touring together with the Bulgarian rock band Sunrize during their Rock on the Rocks tour 2011.
 Vanexa (2016) - Hammond on 'The traveler' from the album 'Too heavy to fly'
 Blind Golem (2021) - Slide guitar and keyboards on ‘The Day Is Gone’ from the album  ‘A Dream Of Fantasy’

Discography

Solo albums
Proud Words on a Dusty Shelf (1973) - AUS #57
Eager to Please (1975)
Free Spirit (1980)
The Best of Ken Hensley (compilation, 1990)
From Time to Time (1994)
A Glimpse of Glory (1999)
Ken Hensley Anthology (compilation, 2000)
Running Blind (2002)
The Last Dance (2003)
The Wizard's Diary Vol. 1 (compilation, CD/DVD, 2004)
Cold Autumn Sunday (2005)
Elements – Anthology 1968 To 2005 (compilation, 2006)
Inside the Mystery (compilation, 2006)
Blood on the Highway (2007)
Live Fire (DVD, 2007)
Blood on the Highway – Release Concert (live DVD, 2008)
Love & Other Mysteries (2012)
Live Tales (live, 2013)
Rare & Timeless (compilation, 2018)
My Book of Answers (2021)

With Uriah Heep
...Very 'Eavy ...Very 'Umble (1970)
Salisbury (1971)
Look at Yourself (1971)
Demons and Wizards (1972)
The Magician's Birthday (1972)
Uriah Heep Live (live, 1973)
Sweet Freedom (1973)
Wonderworld (1974)
Return to Fantasy (1975)
The Best of Uriah Heep (compilation, 1975)
High and Mighty (1976)
Firefly (1977)
Innocent Victim (1977)
Fallen Angel (1978)
Conquest (1980)
Live at Shepperton '74 (live, 1986)
Live in Europe 1979 (live, 1986)
Still 'Eavy Still Proud (compilation, 1990)
Rarities From The Bronze Age (compilation, 1991)
The Lansdowne Tapes (1993)
A Time of Revelation (1996)
Live in San Diego 1974 (live, 1997)
The Magician's Birthday Party (live, recorded 2001, released 2002)
Chapter & Verse – The Uriah Heep Story (compilation, 2005)

With The Gods
 Genesis (1968)
 To Samuel A Son (1969)
 The Gods Featuring Ken Hensley (1976)

With Head Machine
 Orgasm (1969)

With Toe Fat 
 Toe Fat (1970)

With Weed
 Weed...! (1971)

With Blackfoot
 Siogo (1983)
 Vertical Smiles (1984)
 KBFH Presents Blackfoot Live 1983 (live, 1998)

With John Lawton
 The Return (live, 2001)
 Salisbury Live (live, 2001)

With John Wetton
 More Than Conquerors (live, 2002)
 One Way Or Another (live, 2002)

With Ken Hensley & Live Fire
 Faster (2011)
 Live Fire LIVE (live, 2013)
 Trouble (2013)
 Live in Russia (live, 2019)

Books
Uriah Heep – 10 Jahre Rockmusik, Markus Ott and Ken Hensley (1980)
When Too Many Dreams Come True – The Ken Hensley Story (2006)
Easy Livin' Ken Hensleyn vuodet 1970-1980, Mika Järvinen (2013)

References

External links

 Ken Hensley official website
 Official website for pre-1986 Uriah Heep
  Uriah Heep official website
 Uriah Heep France
 Official US Uriah Heep fan website
  "England's Own Uriah Heep" fan website
 Netherlands Uriah Heep fan website
 A biography
 
 Toni Rowland Official Website
 
 Entry at 45cat.com

1945 births
2020 deaths
English rock singers
English heavy metal singers
English rock keyboardists
English heavy metal keyboardists
English rock guitarists
English heavy metal guitarists
English male singers
English songwriters
Slide guitarists
Uriah Heep (band) members
English Christians
English expatriates in Spain
English expatriates in the United States
Blackfoot (band) members
The Gods (band) members
English male guitarists
Toe Fat members
Musicians from London
20th-century English musicians
21st-century English musicians
Sanctuary Records artists
Bronze Records artists